7 is the eighth album by the Vallejo, California musical group Con Funk Shun and the 7th of 11 with Mercury Records.  It was released in 1981 on the Mercury Records label.

Track listing
"Bad Lady" (Danny A. Thomas, Felton Pilate, Linda Lou McCall) 4:09   	
"I'll Get You Back" (Felton Pilate, Nita Wells-Pilate) 5:12 	
"Body Lovers" (Michael Cooper, Perri McKissack) 4:40 	
"Promise You Love" (Michael Cooper, Linda Lou McCall, Anthony Crosley) 7:34 	
"If You're In Need Of Love" (Felton Pilate, Nita Wells-Pilate) 6:35 	
"Straight From The Heart" (Felton Pilate, Nita Wells-Pilate) 4:39 	
"A Song For You" (Paul Harrell, Felton Pilate, Peggy W. Harrell) 5:00 	
"California 1" (Louis A. McCall, Felton Pilate, Linda Lou McCall) 4:36

Personnel

Con Funk Shun
Michael Vernon Cooper: Rhythm and Lead Guitars, Sitar, Synthesizers, Vocals
Felton Pilate II: Lead Guitar, Trombone, Piano, Synthesizers, Vocoder, Vocals
Danny Thomas: Piano, Organ, Synthesizers, Clavinet, Vocoder, Vocals
Karl Fuller: Trumpet, Flugelhorn, Percussion, Vocals
Paul Harrell: Sax, Flute, Percussion, Vocals
Cedric Martin: Bass, Vocals
Louis McCall: Drums, Percussion, Vocals

Additional Personnel
Scott Roberts, Pete Escovedo Jr.: Percussion
Marvin McFadden: Trumpet
Melecio Madgalugo: Sax
Garry Jackson: Bass
Bari Boyer and Joye Carter: Backing Vocals

Charts

Singles

References

External links
 Con Funk Shun-Con Funk Shun 7 at Discogs

1981 albums
Con Funk Shun albums
Mercury Records albums